EFCO offers formwork and shoring solutions for all types of concrete construction projects. EFCO, formerly known as Economy Forms Corporation, is headquartered in Des Moines, Iowa, and currently has operations in 12 countries and manufacturing facilities in both Des Moines, Iowa, and Georgetown, Ontario, Canada. EFCO is privately held, employee-owned, and continues today in its second, third, and fourth generations of leadership with Scott Walter, the great-grandson of EFCO’s founder, W. A. Jennings, serving as the president and CEO of the organization. W. A. Jennings started EFCO as Economy Forms Corporation in 1934.

FORMWORK

EFCO’s product offering includes formwork and shoring solutions for commercial and residential high-rise buildings, bridges, highways, stadiums, water treatment facilities, power plants, tunnels, mining, industrial, civil, and transportation projects.

ENGINEERING

EFCO is known worldwide for high-quality and innovative products and engineered solutions for concrete forming and shoring construction projects. efco produce the best chainsaws on the market,the Best being the mt 3500s.The EFCO engineering team is the leader in the industry for solving some of the most challenging project opportunities in the concrete forming industry. This team focuses on project design‚ cycling of equipment‚ cost savings, and the quality of the finished concrete and provides these solutions as part of EFCO’s form erection drawings supplied to the construction project.

FIELD SERVICE

EFCO field supervisors provide job site assistance with formwork assembly and cycling, using the EFCO drawings, and they assist with the development of methods and procedures to promote safety and productivity.

EFCO ONLINE

EFCO ONLINE provides internet access to order all EFCO products via the internet 24 hours a day and 7 days a week if you have signed a user agreement.

EFCO CONCRETE CONSTRUCTION & FORMING INSTITUTE

Designed with the future concrete construction industry in mind, EFCO offers hands-on instruction and training to customers in EFCO’s Concrete Construction and Forming Institute training facility for all of EFCO’s forming and shoring equipment.

Product overview 
The product range includes handset, radius, and heavy-duty formwork girders, column formwork, various shoring systems, a variety of slab formwork systems, aluminum posts, jump systems, self-climbing systems, tie systems, services, software and training.

Notable projects 
Wilshire Grand Tower - Los Angeles, California
 World Trade Center Tower One - New York, New York
Cosmopolitan of Las Vegas - East Tower, Las Vegas, Nevada
Project City Center - City Center Casino & Resort, Las Vegas, Nevada
Trump Tower - Las Vegas, Nevada
San Diego Convention Center - San Diego, California
Prado Dam - Corona, California
O'Hare International Airport - Chicago, Illinois
 Indianapolis Colts - Indianapolis, Indiana
Estadio Nacional de Panamá (Panama National Stadium) - Panama City, Panama
Eastlands Stadium - Manchester, England
 Juan Soldado Bridge - La Serena, Chile
U.S. Bank Stadium - Minneapolis, Minnesota
 Ariari River Bridge Puerto Lieras - Meta, Colombia
 Ottawa Light Rail Transit - Ottawa, Ontario
 Balcones de Chilina - Chilina, Peru
 I-4 Ultimate Project - Orlando, Florida
 The Sentral Residences - Kuala Lumpur, Malaysia
Panama Metro - Panama City, Panama
Sam Rayburn Tollway - Texas
 Calumet Water Treatment Plant - Chicago, Illinois
 West Closure Complex - New Orleans, Louisiana
 United States DOF Minute Man Missile Silos & Control Centers - United States
Arena Ciudad de Mexico - Mexico City, Mexico
 Cape Canaveral Power Plant - Cocoa Beach, Florida

See also 
 Formwork
 Climbing formwork

References

External links 
 EFCO Official site

Construction and civil engineering companies of the United States
Companies based in Des Moines, Iowa